The McGill Redbirds (formerly the McGill Redmen) and McGill Martlets are the varsity athletic teams that represent McGill University in Montreal, Quebec, Canada.

Team name

According to Suzanne Morton, a professor of history at McGill, the name "McGill Redmen" was first adopted in 1927, initially intended to reflect James McGill's Scottish heritage and hair color. Despite this, after the hiring of a new football coach from the United States sometime before 1940, Indigenous imagery was brought in to accompany the name as a show of spectacle. Men's teams became colloquially known as the "Indians" and from 1961 to 1967 women's teams were formally known as the "Super Squaws".

1950s McGill team logos featured Aboriginal Canadian iconography and reports by news sources in the 1950s refer to the "McGill Indians" in their sports reporting. Stereotyped Indigenous iconography was on McGill football and hockey team jerseys and helmets until 1992 when a student-led campaign against the name and imagery led to their removal. At the same time, a large crest depicting an Indigenous man wearing a headdress was removed from the McGill gym.

A second student-led campaign, #ChangeTheName, was organized in 2017 by the McGill Student Union Indigenous Affairs committee. In a 2018 referendum organized by McGill's student union, 78.8% of 5,856 participating students voted in favour of changing the teams' name. 

On April 12, 2019, McGill announced that "McGill University's men's varsity teams will cease to be called the Redmen." On November 17, 2020, "Redbirds" was announced as the new name for the McGill men's varsity teams.

Mascot
Since 2005, the mascot for both the men's and women's varsity teams has been Marty the Martlet. The mascot made its first appearance at the 2005 Homecoming men's football game, where it was presented to the McGill Athletics Department by the Student Organization for Alumni Relations.

Football

The McGill U Sports football Redbirds is one of the oldest in all of Canada, having begun organized competition in 1874. The team has appeared in three Vanier Cup national championships, in 1969, 1973 and 1987, with the team finally winning the title in the 1987 game. McGill plays out of Percival Molson Memorial Stadium, where the Canadian Football League's Montreal Alouettes also play.

After their 2005 suspension, the team struggled with three losing seasons, including two winless seasons in 2007 and 2008. The program showed signs of hope as the team won three games in 2009, but soon sank back down to futility with consecutive winless campaigns in 2010 and 2011.

Ice hockey

On March 3, 1875 the first organized indoor game was played at Montreal's Victoria Skating Rink by James George Aylwin Creighton and several McGill University students. In 1877, several McGill students, including Creighton, Henry Joseph, Richard F. Smith, W.F. Robertson, and W.L. Murray codified seven ice hockey rules. The McGill University Hockey Club – later re-christened "The Redmen" – was founded in 1877, arguably making the McGill men's hockey team the first and oldest ice hockey club in the world.

The university operates both men's and women's teams in U Sports. The teams play at McGill's McConnell Arena. The men's team has won championships in 1883, 1903, 1905, 1912, 1918, 1921, 1930, 1931, 1933, 1934, 1935, 1936, 1937, 1938, 1939, 1946, 2006, 2008, 2009, 2010, 2011 and 2012, including the 2012 CIS University Cup national championship. The women's team has won championships in 1985, 2003, 2006, 2007, 2008, 2009 and 2010.

On November 15, 2003, Kim St. Pierre was the first woman in U Sports history to be credited with a win in a men's regular season game.  This occurred when McGill defeated the Ryerson Rams by a score of 5–2.

Other sports

Lacrosse

Lacrosse was played to a limited extent at McGill as early as 1873. The 15-man McGill Lacrosse Club of 1898 was led by F. L. Thompson (President), R. H. Craig (Vice President), and A. J. Grant (Secretary Treasurer). Numerous American clubs, including Brooklyn, Staten Island, Yale, and Harvard, challenged that McGill Lacrosse Club, but it was impossible to accept on account of approaching exams.

McGill's lacrosse tradition was not re-established until 2001, when a McGill freshman organized a student lacrosse club.  In 2002 the team gained Level-3 varsity club status at McGill, and joined the Canadian University Field Lacrosse Association, Canada's premier league founded in 1985. In 2007 the team's status was elevated to a Level-2 varsity team by McGill Athletics. McGill has twice won Canada's national championship, the Baggataway Cup, in 2012 and 2015.  McGill competes in the CUFLA East versus Bishop's, Carleton, Nipissing, Ottawa, Trent and Queen's Universities.

Four-time recipient of the Harry Griffith's Award in 2007, 2008, 2012 and 2015, the team has won eight CUFLA East conference titles in 2007, 2011, 2012, 2013, 2014, 2015, 2016 and 2017.  The team has achieved a record of 97–11–1 since 2011 versus Canadian opponents. The hybrid Canadian-box-American-field lacrosse program is geographically diverse with student-athletes recruited from across Canada and the US. The team plays home games in McGill's Percival Molson Memorial Stadium.

Soccer

The soccer program at McGill operates for a big part of the school year.  On top of the regular U Sports fall season there is a Quebec indoor season, which runs from January to mid March. 
Preparation for the U Sports season starts with try-outs in mid-August and several preseason games against NCAA teams.

Sailing
McGill's sailing program was founded in 1937, and the first regattas took place in Kingston. McGill's first win came in the 1938 Canadian Intercollegiate Dinghy Racing Association National Championships. Today, the team competes in the New England Intercollegiate Sailing Association, which itself is a part of the Intercollegiate Sailing Association and in the Canadian Intercollegiate Sailing Association. The team trains out of the Royal St. Lawrence Yacht Club throughout the fall and competes in dinghies such as the collegiate 420 and the Flying Junior.

Baseball
The baseball team plays in the Canadian Collegiate Baseball Association (CCBA). They have won seven national championships (2006 and 2010 under the old CIBA banner and 2014, 2015, 2016, 2017, and 2018 under the new CCBA banner), and have appeared in two national finals (2005 and 2008). In the 2016 CCBA National Tournament, held at Ahuntsic Park in Montreal, the Redmen went 2–1 in pool play, advancing to the semi-finals where they defeated the Saint Mary's Huskies by a score of 21–0, and then defeated the Montreal Carabins in the national championship game 3–2 on a walk-off home run by catcher Christopher Stanford. This victory marked a three-peat for the Redmen as Canadian National Champions, a streak which has now been extended to five straight national championships. The team plays out of Trudeau Park in Côte-Saint-Luc.

Controversy

2005 hazing scandal
A 2005 hazing scandal forced the cancellation of the final two games in the McGill Redbirds football season. An investigation into the incident showed that "the event did involve nudity, degrading positions and behaviours, gagging, touching in inappropriate manners with a broomstick, as well as verbal and physical intimidation of rookies by a large portion of the team." In 2006, McGill's Senate approved a proposed anti-hazing policy to define forbidden initiation practices.

See also
Indigenous team name controversy
U Sports

References

External links
 

 
 
U Sports teams
U Sports teams in Montreal
U Sports teams in Quebec
Quebec Rugby Football Union teams
Red